Melville, Nova Scotia  may refer to:

 Melville, Inverness County, Nova Scotia
 Melville, Pictou County, Nova Scotia
 Melville Cove, Halifax County, Nova Scotia